Wayne M. Perry (born December 12, 1950) is a retired American businessman and former national president of the Boy Scouts of America (2012–2014).

Business
After graduating from the University of Washington with a bachelor's degree (cum laude), Perry earned his law degree (J.D.) from Northwestern School of Law of Lewis & Clark College (cum laude) and earned an L.L.M. in Taxation from New York University School of Law. He is a member of the Washington State Bar Association.

Perry started at McCaw Cellular Communications Inc. in 1976.  He served as legal officer, General Counsel, and Executive Vice President before becoming President in 1985. After McCaw's merger with AT&T Wireless Services in September 1994, Perry served as Vice-Chairman of AT&T Wireless Services. Perry joined NEXTLINK Communications as chief executive officer and vice-chairman before co-founding Edge Wireless in 1999.  Already partly owned by AT&T Wireless, Edge Wireless was acquired in its entirety by AT&T Wireless in 2008.

He also maintains close ties with his L.L.M. alma mater, New York University Law School, where he serves on the board of trustees and on the finance committee.  He is also a minority owner of the Seattle Mariners

Perry has taught at the University of Washington Business School as a visiting professor for classes on mergers and acquisitions.

Scouting
Perry joined the Boy Scouts of America as a Cub Scout.  He has served as Scoutmaster, district chairman, Explorer advisor, Cubmaster, and president of the Chief Seattle Council as well as of the Western Region.

Perry has been awarded the Silver Buffalo Award, Silver Antelope Award, Silver Beaver Award and District Award of Merit.  He is a member of the Order of the Arrow and earned the Wood Badge advanced training recognition and is currently staffing as a Troop Guide on Wood Badge course W1-609-15-2 in the Chief Seattle Council.  In addition Perry was awarded the BSA Heroism Award.  He is also a holder of the World Organization of the Scout Movement's Bronze Wolf Award.

He was appointed to the National Executive Board, and became the International Commissioner of the BSA in May 2006.  Perry served as a member of the World Committee until July 2008, having been selected to replace Steve Fossett in September 2006. Perry was elected the National President of the BSA by the National Executive Board in May 2012. Perry served as National President of the BSA until May 2014, at which time he was succeeded by Robert Gates.

Personal
Perry is married to Christine and has four sons, Kevin, Gregory, Douglas, and Justin. He is a member of the Church of Jesus Christ of Latter-day Saints.

References

External links
Wayne Perry, new member of the World Scout Committee
 BSA International Volunteer Leadership
 Wayne Perry: The Future of Wireless Communications

University of Washington alumni
New York University School of Law alumni
American telecommunications industry businesspeople
World Scout Committee members
Living people
American Latter Day Saints
Lewis & Clark Law School alumni
National Executive Board of the Boy Scouts of America members
Recipients of the Bronze Wolf Award
1950 births
People from Medina, Washington
Presidents of the Boy Scouts of America